Galenika can refer to:

 Galenika a.d., a pharmaceutical company from Zemun (Belgrade), Serbia.
 Galenika, Zemun, an urban neighborhood in Zemun
 FK Zemun (formerly FK Galenika), football club from Zemun